Wesley Joel Matthews Sr. (born August 24, 1959) is an American former professional basketball player who played in the National Basketball Association (NBA).  He won two NBA championships with the Los Angeles Lakers. He is the father of current NBA player Wesley Matthews.

Basketball career
Matthews graduated from Warren Harding High School in Bridgeport, Connecticut, in 1977. A  point guard at the University of Wisconsin–Madison, he was selected by the Washington Bullets with the 14th pick of the 1980 NBA draft. He played nine seasons in the league with the Bullets, Atlanta Hawks (two stints), Philadelphia 76ers, Chicago Bulls, San Antonio Spurs and Los Angeles Lakers. Averaging eight points and four assists per game, he scored 3,654 career points and earned NBA Championship rings with the 1987 and 1988 Lakers.

Matthews retired from professional basketball in 1996. Besides his NBA stints, he also played in the United States Basketball League, in the Continental Basketball Association and in Italy, spending the 1989–90 season at Ranger Varese before being called by the Hawks for one regular season match.

He had a stint in the Philippine Basketball Association (PBA), winning the best import award in 1991 for Ginebra San Miguel.

Career statistics

NBA

Regular season

|-
| style="text-align:left;" rowspan="2"| 
| style="text-align:left;"|Washington
| 45 ||  || 25.8 || .499 || .333 || .767 || 1.5 || 4.4 || 1.0 || 0.2 || 12.3
|-
| style="text-align:left;"|Atlanta
| 34 ||  || 32.5 || .488 || .000 || .837 || 2.1 || 6.2 || 1.8 || 0.2 || 12.5
|-
| style="text-align:left;"|
| style="text-align:left;"|Atlanta
| 47 || 5 || 17.8 || .440 || .250 || .759 || 1.2 || 3.0 || 1.1 || 0.0 || 6.9
|-
| style="text-align:left;"|
| style="text-align:left;"|Atlanta
| 64 || 0 || 18.5 || .403 || .292 || .768 || 1.4 || 3.9 || 0.9 || 0.1 || 6.9
|-
| style="text-align:left;" rowspan="2"| 
| style="text-align:left;"|Atlanta
| 6 || 0 || 16.0 || .533 || .000 || .818 || 0.7 || 3.5 || 0.8 || 0.2 || 8.3
|-
| style="text-align:left;"|Philadelphia
| 14 || 5 || 20.9 || .446 || .143 || .643 || 1.6 || 4.4 || 0.8 || 0.1 || 7.1
|-
| style="text-align:left;"|
| style="text-align:left;"|Chicago
| 78 || 38 || 19.5 || .495 || .125 || .694 || 0.9 || 4.5 || 0.9 || 0.2 || 5.7
|-
| style="text-align:left;"|
| style="text-align:left;"|San Antonio
| 75 || 46 || 24.7 || .531 || .160 || .820 || 1.7 || 6.3 || 1.2 || 0.4 || 10.9
|-
| style="text-align:left; background:#afe6ba;"|†
| style="text-align:left;"|L.A. Lakers
| 50 || 0 || 10.6 || .476 || .333 || .806 || 0.9 || 2.0 || 0.5 || 0.1 || 4.2
|-
| style="text-align:left; background:#afe6ba;"|†
| style="text-align:left;"|L.A. Lakers
| 51 || 8 || 13.8 || .460 || .233 || .831 || 1.3 || 2.7 || 0.5 || 0.1 || 5.7
|-
| style="text-align:left;"|
| style="text-align:left;"|Atlanta
| 1 || 0 || 13.0 || .333 || .000 || 1.000 || 0.0 || 5.0 || 0.0 || 0.0 || 4.0
|- class="sortbottom"
| style="text-align:center;" colspan="2"|Career
| 465 || 102 || 20.0 || .478 || .225 || .788 || 1.3 || 4.2 || 1.0 || 0.2 || 7.9
|- class="sortbottom"

Playoffs

|-
| style="text-align:left;"|1982
| style="text-align:left;"|Atlanta
| 4 ||  || 14.0 || .200 ||  || 1.000 || 0.0 || 2.0 || 0.0 || 0.5 || 4.0
|-
| style="text-align:left;"|1983
| style="text-align:left;"|Atlanta
| 3 ||  || 12.7 || .333 || .000 || .800 || 0.0 || 3.7 || 0.0 || 0.3 || 3.3
|-
| style="text-align:left;"|1984
| style="text-align:left;"|Philadelphia
| 4 ||  || 5.8 || .500 || .500 || .500 || 0.0 || 1.0 || 0.3 || 0.0 || 2.5
|-
| style="text-align:left;"|1985
| style="text-align:left;"|Chicago
| 4 || 4 || 22.8 || .344 || .000 || .778 || 1.5 || 3.0 || 1.3 || 0.0 || 7.3
|-
| style="text-align:left;"|1986
| style="text-align:left;"|San Antonio
| 3 || 3 || 38.7 || .648 || .000 || .750 || 2.3 || 8.0 || 2.0 || 0.0 || 25.3
|-
| style="text-align:left; background:#afe6ba;"|1987†
| style="text-align:left;"|L.A. Lakers
| 12 || 0 || 5.1 || .478 || .000 || .857 || 0.3 || 0.8 || 0.1 || 0.0 || 2.3
|-
| style="text-align:left; background:#afe6ba;"|1988†
| style="text-align:left;"|L.A. Lakers
| 10 || 0 || 2.7 || .400 || .000 || .800 || 0.1 || 0.2 || 0.1 || 0.0 || 1.2
|- class="sortbottom"
| style="text-align:center;" colspan="2"|Career
| 38 || 7 || 10.1 || .482 || .111 || .800 || 0.5 || 1.7 || 0.4 || 0.1 || 4.6

Personal life
Matthews' son, Wesley, also a basketball guard, played for Marquette University, and has appeared professionally for the Utah Jazz, the Portland Trail Blazers, the Dallas Mavericks, the New York Knicks, Indiana Pacers, the Los Angeles Lakers, and currently the Milwaukee Bucks since going undrafted in 2009.

Notes

External links

1959 births
Living people
African-American basketball players
American expatriate basketball people in Brazil
American expatriate basketball people in Italy
American expatriate basketball people in the Philippines
American men's basketball players
Atlanta Hawks players
Barangay Ginebra San Miguel players
Basketball players from Florida
Chicago Bulls players
Fort Wayne Fury players
Los Angeles Lakers players
Ohio Mixers players
Pallacanestro Varese players
Parade High School All-Americans (boys' basketball)
Philadelphia 76ers players
Philippine Basketball Association imports
Point guards
Rapid City Thrillers players
Rochester Renegade players
San Antonio Spurs players
Sportspeople from Sarasota, Florida
Warren Harding High School alumni
Washington Bullets draft picks
Washington Bullets players
Wisconsin Badgers men's basketball players
21st-century African-American people
20th-century African-American sportspeople